Taihe County is a county in northwestern Anhui Province, China, bordering Henan Province to the north. It is under the administration of Fuyang City.

Administrative divisions
In the present, Taihe County has 26 towns and 5 townships.
26 towns

5 townships

Climate

References

 
Fuyang